Randolph Allin Crossley (July 10, 1904 – February 23, 2004) was an American politician in the state of Hawaii. He served in the Hawaii House of Representatives from 1943 to 1945 and the Hawaii State Senate from 1959 to 1964 and was a Republican.

Crossley was born in Cupertino, California in 1904 to John and Elizabeth (née Hall) Crossley.  He attended the University of California from 1923 to 1925. In 1928, he married Florence Pepperdine, the daughter of Pepperdine University founder George Pepperdine. They had one daughter in 1931. Crossley was a businessman and owned an advertising business (Crossley Advertising), Crossley Construction, Aloha Stamp Co., Crossley Flowers and Pacific Savings and Loan. Crossley also worked in the tuna and pineapple packing industries. He was nominated by president Dwight D. Eisenhower in 1953 to become Governor of Hawaii; however this nomination was later withdrawn due to political opposition in the period leading up to the Hawaii Democratic Revolution of 1954. In 1966 and 1974, he ran unsuccessfully for Governor of Hawaii. In 1977, Crossley retired to Pebble Beach, CA, following the failure of his latest business. He died in 2004 at the age of 99.

References

|-

1904 births
2004 deaths
20th-century American politicians
Republican Party Hawaii state senators
Republican Party members of the Hawaii House of Representatives